The Garden is an American drama-horror film from 2006. It was directed by Don Michael Paul, written by Sam Bozzo, starring Lance Henriksen and Brian Wimmer. The film was produced under the working title River to Havilah.

Cast
 Lance Henriksen – Ben Zachary
 Brian Wimmer – David
 Adam Taylor Gordon – Sam
 Claudia Christian – Dr. Cairns
 Sean Young – Miss Grace Chapman
 Victoria Justice – Holly
 Erik Walker – Jesse
 Ariana Richmond – Trashy Girl #1
 Jennifer Lutheran – Trashy Girl #2
 Rick Barker – Faceless Person

References

External links
 

2000s horror drama films
American horror drama films
2006 films
Films directed by Don Michael Paul
2006 drama films
2000s English-language films
2000s American films